Deoxyadenosine triphosphate (dATP) is a nucleotide used in cells for DNA synthesis (or replication), as a substrate of DNA polymerase. It is classified as a purine nucleoside triphosphate, with its chemical structure consisting of a deoxyribose sugar molecule bound to an adenine and to three phosphate groups. It differs from the energy-transferring molecule adenosine triphosphate (ATP) by a single hydroxyl group (the -OH group on the 2' carbon of the pentose sugar is replaced by -H in dATP), resulting in a deoxyribose instead of a ribose. Two phosphate groups can be hydrolyzed to yield deoxyadenosine monophosphate, which can then be used to synthesize DNA.

Findings have also suggested that dATP can act as an energy-transferring molecule to maintain cell viability.

Synthesis

Enzymatic synthesis of deoxyadenosine triphosphate 
Deoxyadenosine triphosphate is able to be enzymatically synthesized with DNA as the starting material using deoxyribonuclease (DNase), nuclease P1, adenylate kinase, and pyruvate kinase. The synthesis starts with the heat denaturation of DNA followed by treatment with DNase I to produce oligomers. Next, the solution is treated with nuclease P1 to form deoxynucleoside monophosphates. Using a mixture of adenylate kinase and pyruvate kinase, the deoxyadenosine monophosphate was selectively converted to dATP. After purification, a purity of 90%-95% can be achieved using this method of synthesis with a 40% overall yield.

Health effects

In immunocompromised individuals 
High levels of dATP in the body can be toxic and result in impaired immune function, since dATP acts as a noncompetitive inhibitor for the DNA synthesis enzyme ribonucleotide reductase. Patients with adenosine deaminase deficiency (ADA) tend to have elevated intracellular dATP concentrations because adenosine deaminase normally curbs adenosine levels by converting it into inosine.

Deficiency of the enzyme adenosine deaminase is known to cause immunodeficiency in individuals. Research has found that dATP may be a potential toxic metabolite in adenosine deaminase deficiency. Patients in the study who were immunodeficient and adenosine deaminase deficient were found to have over 50 times the levels of dATP in their erythrocytes compared to non-immunodeficient, adenosine deaminase deficient patients. This is abnormal and provides evidence that increased erythrocyte dATP levels are the toxic metabolites responsible for immune system deficiency in individuals with adenosine deaminase deficiency. Infusion of normal, non-enzyme deficient erythrocytes resulted in the loss of dATP in the erythrocytes of these individuals.

Cells lacking the ability to transport or phosphorylate dATP have been shown to exhibit increased resistance to the toxic effects of excessive dATP, suggesting that the toxicity of dATP is dependent on the ability to intracellularly phosphorylate dATP. As such, some treatments for ADA focus on reducing dATP phosphorylation by the targeted inhibition of the responsible deoxynucleoside kinases, such as adenosine kinase and deoxycytidine kinase. Deoxycytidine administered intravenously has also been used as an ADA treatment, although a clinical study found that deoxycytidine had only limited clinical effects on the T-cell immunity of ADA patients without discounting that some patients may respond more significantly to deoxycytidine therapy.

In cardiac muscle

In cardiac myosin, dATP has been shown to be a viable alternative to ATP as an energy substrate for facilitating cross-bridge formation. In an experiment involving canine dilated cardiomyopathy (DCM), increasing cardiac dATP was found to be a potentially effective treatment for DCM. dATP can increase contractility as well as systolic pressure in a failing heart and that it can also enhance contraction as well as restoring the cardiac pump function. Further, dATP has been found not only to restore normal systolic function in patients with cardiovascular impairments but that it can also increase contraction, as well as the rate of cross-bridge of the cardiac muscle of patients in their end-stage congestive heart failure without hindering, or impairing the systolic relaxation.

dATP inhibition of Ribonucleotide reductases 

The class Ia Ribonucleotide reductase of the E.coli confirms that dATP regulates the activities of the Ribonucleotide reductase by binding to the A site of the nucleotide binding sites. The inhibition of the class Ia Ribonucleotide reductase of the E. coli by the dATP is due to the increased space between the cysteine and tyrosine radical cofactor in C-site and 𝛃2 respectively, which in turn inhibits the formation of the active site which is usually necessary reduction. In human Ribonucleotide reductase, dATP induced α6 structure inhibits the activity of the Ribonucleotide reductase by preventing 𝛃 subunit from accessing the active site of the of 𝛂 subunit.

See also 
 Adenosine triphosphate (ATP)
 Adenosine deaminase deficiency (ADA)
 Dilated cardiomyopathy (DCM)
 Ribonucleotide reductases (RNR)

References

External links 
 KEGG entry on dATP

Nucleotides
Phosphate esters